Andrew Zaltzman (born 6 October 1974) is a British comedian and author who largely deals in political and sport-related material. 

He has worked with John Oliver, with their work together including Political Animal, The Department, and The Bugle. Since 2016 he has been a statistician for BBC Radio's Test Match Special cricket commentaries, and since 2020 the presenter of Radio 4's The News Quiz.

Early life
Born in Hammersmith, west London, Zaltzman is of Lithuanian-Jewish ancestry. He is the son of South African sculptor Zack Zaltzman and is the older brother of Helen Zaltzman, of The Allusionist and Answer Me This! podcasts.

From his prep school, Holmewood House School in Langton Green, Kent, he then attended the private Tonbridge School. He graduated in Classics at University College, Oxford. While at university, Zaltzman was sports editor for The Oxford Student.

Career
Stand-up
Edinburgh Festival Fringe
Zaltzman first performed at the Edinburgh Festival Fringe in 1999, when he was a finalist in the prestigious So You Think You're Funny new act competition along with Josie Long, Russell Howard, and David O'Doherty.

His debut full-length Edinburgh Fringe show Andy Zaltzman versus the Dog of Doom received a nomination for Best Newcomer at the Perrier Comedy Awards in 2001.

In 2004, Zaltzman began – initially with John Oliver – hosting Political Animal, a stand-up show in which different acts perform political-themed material; Zaltzman has hosted solo since 2006. Political Animal later transferred to BBC Radio 4. 

Zaltzman also appeared in a late-night show with fellow stand-ups Daniel Kitson, David O'Doherty, and Alun Cochrane entitled The Honourable Men of Art, at The Stand in 2006 and 2008. 

Melbourne International Comedy Festival
Zaltzman performed at the Melbourne International Comedy Festival for the first time in April 2007, winning the coveted Piece of Wood Award, given to the best show as voted for by other comedians.

Other stand-up
In 2011, Zaltzman appeared as a guest stand-up comic on Russell Howard's Good News Extra. In 2013 he also contributed a review of that year's World Snooker Championship to BBC Television's regular coverage of the event.

Since mid-2014, Zaltzman has toured Satirist for Hire, where questions and comments are solicited from potential or confirmed audiences (usually via email or social media) before performing at venues, giving parts of the show a constantly evolving order and structure. In December, 2014, Zaltzman performed at the Lord’s Taverners charity Christmas lunch. 

Radio, podcast and TV 

 The Department 
Zaltzman and John Oliver gained their first big break when they teamed up with the multi-Perrier Award nominated Chris Addison on The Department, a short-running radio show based on the premise that Chris, Andy and John, were a three-man organisation brainstorming to solve society's problems.

The Bugle

Zaltzman has co-hosted The Bugle, a weekly satirical comedy podcast, since 2007.

From October 2007 until June 2016, the podcast was hosted by Zaltzman with John Oliver. In June 2016, Oliver left the show due to other commitments. The show was officially re-launched on 24 October 2016. Producer Chris Skinner remained on the show along with Zaltzman and a rotating group of co-hosts. The first set of new co-hosts included Wyatt Cenac (US), Hari Kondabolu (US), Tiff Stevenson (UK), Nish Kumar (UK), Alice Fraser (Australia), Anuvab Pal (India), Tom Ballard (Australia), and Helen Zaltzman (UK).The Bugle was hosted by The Times until December 2011 and the podcast has since been independent, relying upon listeners' contributions to continue.  

In 2016 the podcast relaunched and became a member of the Radiotopia podcast network. In December 2018, it was announced The Bugle would be leaving Radiotopia. 

Other radio, podcast and TV 
In July 2009, Zaltzman hosted a Saturday morning show on BBC Radio 5 Live entitled Yes, It's The Ashes, taking a comic look at the 2009 Ashes.

Zaltzman presented his own four-part BBC Radio 4 programme in December 2009 entitled Andy Zaltzman's History of the Third Millennium, Series 1 of 100. Also featuring Rory Bremner and Bridget Christie, the show contained stand-up and sketches focusing on the last 10 years.

Zaltzman was a regular co-host, along with comedians Al Murray and Rebecca Front of the satirical news programme 7 Day Sunday (also broadcast as 7 Day Saturday). The show had been running on BBC Radio 5 Live since starting in January 2010.

Zaltzman is also an occasional guest on the online cricket radio commentary station Test match Sofa and on TalkSPORT's cricket show Howzat. More recently he has appeared on Test Match Sofa's successor www.guerillacricket.com and was an occasional member of the team when they broadcast the programme from a central London sports bar for the 2015 Ashes. 

He has appeared on The Weekly with Charlie Pickering on ABC Television in Australia since 2015.

In 2016 Zaltzman became the scorer for Test Match Special on BBC Radio 4 on the Sri Lankan tour of England. From 10 June 2016, he hosted Zaltzman's Summer of Sport podcast published by The Guardian. From 17 November 2017, he co-hosted The Urnbelievable Ashes with Felicity Ward, a podcast published by the Australian Broadcasting Corporation.

In 2017 he wrote and performed a three-part series on ancient philosophy including Stoicism, Epicureanism  and Cynicism for BBC Radio 4.

In 2018, along with comedian and occasional The Bugle co-host Anuvab Pal, he wrote and performed in Empire-ical Evidence a look at the rise and fall of the British Empire produced for BBC Radio 4.

Having hosted one of three series of The News Quiz, sharing duties with Angela Barnes and Nish Kumar in 2020  Andy Zaltzman has been the permanent chair since 2021.

Writing
Zaltzman has worked with Rory Bremner on a number of projects, these include Transatlantic, a US election special for BBC Radio 4 and several series of Bremner, Bird and Fortune. In June 2007, BBC2's The Culture Show commissioned Zaltzman and John Oliver to write a mock farewell speech for departing Prime Minister Tony Blair. The speech was then animated by Triffic Films, with the voice of Blair played by Bremner.

In November 2008, his first book, entitled Does Anything Eat Bankers?: And 53 Other Indispensable Questions for the Credit Crunched, was published.

Video games

Zaltzman played the host of The Bug podcast in 2020's Watch Dogs: Legion, alongside his Bugle co-host Alice Fraser - the show is highly satirical and takes direct inspiration from The Bugle in its approach and delivery.

Cricket
Zaltzman is a huge fan of cricket and in November 2008 began a regular blog for Cricinfo, named "The Confectionery Stall" after a famous piece of commentary by Richie Benaud, where he described a shot by Ian Botham during his innings at the third Ashes Test Match at Headingley, in 1981 as having "gone straight into the Confectionery Stall and out again". Alongside Jarrod Kimber, he hosts a podcast on cricket known as The Cricket Sadist Hour.

Zaltzman's blog covered the 2011 World Cup for Cricinfo, supported by a number of podcasts.

Zaltzman has also appeared on the internet radio site Guerilla Cricket, and has played for the Authors XI cricket team.

Zaltzman was the statistician on Test Match Special for the three-match Wisden Trophy series between England and West Indies in July 2020 and between England and Pakistan a month later.

Personal life
Zaltzman's wife is a barrister and they have two children, a daughter born January 2007 and a son born December 2008. Zaltzman delivered his son at home due to his wife entering labour suddenly. His sister Helen Zaltzman is a comedian and podcaster.

Works
 Does Anything Eat Bankers?: And 53 Other Indispensable Questions for the Credit Crunched.'' Old Street Publishing, 2008.

References

External links 

Official site
Andy Zaltzman on Chortle

1974 births
People educated at Tonbridge School
Living people
Alumni of University College, Oxford
British stand-up comedians
Jewish British comedians
People from Hammersmith
English podcasters
21st-century British comedians
Cricket statisticians